Worse than Watergate: The Secret Presidency of George W. Bush is a 2004 book by author and Watergate figure John W. Dean.  Dean criticizes the secrecy employed by US President Bush and his Vice-President Dick Cheney, depriving citizens of the ability to make informed decisions, and draws parallels with the government of US President Richard Nixon for whom he served as legal counsel. He also draws attention to potentially serious issues that, as of 2004, had been given a low profile in the US media. In particular, he notes that the 18 March 2003 presidential determination, a condition of the legislation which authorized the 2003 invasion of Iraq, failed to satisfy the terms imposed by Congress and consequently would justify impeachment.

Publication information
Worse than Watergate: The Secret Presidency of George W. Bush (2004). Little, Brown & Company.

See also
Executive Order 13233
The Prosecution of George W. Bush for Murder

References
 USA Today/AP article featuring author, referencing the book.
 New York Times book review.

2004 non-fiction books
American political books
Books about George W. Bush
Books about the 2003 invasion of Iraq
Current affairs books
English-language books
Presidential impeachment in the United States